Yilianny Sablón Pavón (born 17 January 2000) is a Cuban footballer who plays as a midfielder. She has been a member of the Cuba women's national team.

International career
Sablón capped for Cuba at senior level during the 2018 CONCACAF Women's Championship qualification.

International goals
Scores and results list Cuba's goal tally first

References

2000 births
Living people
Cuban women's footballers
Cuba women's international footballers
Women's association football midfielders
21st-century Cuban women